Megachile addubitans is a species of bee in the family Megachilidae. It was described by Theodore Dru Alison Cockerell in 1931.

References

Addubitans
Insects described in 1931